"Défiler" is a song by Belgian singer Stromae. It was released on 27 April 2018 as a single. It reached the top 10 in Wallonia and France.

Charts

References

2018 songs
2018 singles
Songs written by Stromae
Stromae songs